Dr Johnson's House is a writer's house museum in London in the  former home of the 18th-century English writer and lexicographer Samuel Johnson.  The house is a Grade I listed building.

Description

Built at the end of the seventeenth century by wool merchant Richard Gough, (died 1728) it is a rare example of a house of its era which survives in the City of London (this refers only to the 'Square Mile' of the City area, as there are many other houses of this period elsewhere in Greater London) and is the only one of Johnson's 18 residences in the City to survive. Four bays wide and five stories tall, it is located at No. 17, Gough Square, a small L-shaped court, now pedestrianised, in a tangle of ancient alleyways just to the north of Fleet Street.

Johnson lived and worked in the house from 1748 to 1759, paying a rent of £30, and he compiled his famous A Dictionary of the English Language there. In the 19th century, it saw use as a hotel, a print shop and a storehouse. In 1911, it was purchased by newspaper magnate and politician Cecil Harmsworth, who later commented: "At the time of my purchase of the house in April 1911, it presented every appearance of squalor and decay … It is doubtful whether in the whole of London there existed a more forlorn or dilapidated tenement." He restored the house under the direction of architect Alfred Burr and opened it to the public in 1914. It is now operated by a charitable trust, Dr Johnson's House Trust Ltd.

The house features panelled rooms, a pine staircase, and a collection of period furniture, prints and portraits. There are exhibitions about Johnson's life and work. The house has a commemorative plaque installed on its exterior by the Royal Society of Arts in 1898.

See also
 Samuel Johnson Birthplace Museum in Lichfield
 Hodge (cat)

References

Further reading

External links

 
 Image of Dr Johnson's House at the English Heritage Archive

Houses in the City of London
History of the City of London
Biographical museums in London
Literary museums in London
Historic house museums in London
Museums in the City of London
Houses completed in 1700
Museums established in 1914
1914 establishments in England
Samuel Johnson
Grade I listed houses
Grade I listed buildings in the City of London
Grade I listed museum buildings
1700 establishments in England